The Mariscal Cáceres Province (Spanish mariscal marshal) is one of ten provinces of the San Martín Region in northern Peru.

The province was named after the 19th Century Peruvian president Andrés Avelino Cáceres.

Political division
The province is divided into five districts.
Campanilla (Campanilla)
Huicungo (Huicungo)
Juanjui (Juanjui)
Pachiza (Pachiza)
Pajarillo (Pajarillo)

Provinces of the San Martín Region